Anthony Waye is a film production executive. He worked on a number of James Bond films, including For Your Eyes Only, Octopussy, A View to a Kill, The Living Daylights, GoldenEye, Tomorrow Never Dies and the 2006 version of Casino Royale.  He is married to Patricia, the daughter of a fellow Pinewood crew-member.

Waye is best known for his involvement in the Bond franchise since Octopussy, until his recent retirement.

References

External links

Year of birth missing (living people)
Living people
British film producers